The Comanche  or Nʉmʉnʉʉ ("the people") are a Native American tribe from the Southern Plains of the present-day United States. Comanche people today belong to the federally recognized Comanche Nation, headquartered in Lawton, Oklahoma.

The Comanche language is a Numic language of the Uto-Aztecan family. Originally, it was a Shoshoni dialect, but diverged and became a separate language. The Comanche were once part of the Shoshone people of the Great Basin.

In the 18th and 19th centuries, Comanche lived in most of present-day northwestern Texas and adjacent areas in eastern New Mexico, southeastern Colorado, southwestern Kansas, and western Oklahoma. Spanish colonists and later Mexicans called their historical territory Comanchería.

During the 18th and 19th centuries, Comanche practiced a nomadic horse culture and hunted, particularly bison. They traded with neighboring Native American peoples, and Spanish, French, and American colonists and settlers.

As European Americans encroached on their territory, the Comanche waged war on and raided their settlements, as well as those of neighboring Native American tribes. They took captives from other tribes during warfare, using them as slaves, selling them to the Spanish and (later) Mexican settlers, or adopting them into their tribe. Thousands of captives from raids on Spanish, Mexican, and American settlers assimilated into Comanche society. At their peak, the Comanche language was the lingua franca of the Great Plains region.

Decimated by European diseases, warfare, and encroachment by Europeans on Comanchería, most Comanche were forced to live on reservations in Indian Territory by the late 1870s.

In the 21st century, the Comanche Nation has 17,000 members, around 7,000 of whom reside in tribal jurisdictional areas around Lawton, Fort Sill, and the surrounding areas of southwestern Oklahoma. The Comanche Homecoming Annual Dance takes place in mid-July in Walters, Oklahoma.

Name 
The Comanche's autonym is nʉmʉnʉʉ, meaning "the human beings" or "the people". The earliest known use of the term "Comanche" dates to 1706, when the Comanche were reported by Spanish officials to be preparing to attack far-outlying Pueblo settlements in southern Colorado. The Spanish adopted the Ute name for the people: kɨmantsi (enemy), and transliterated it into their own language phonetics. Before 1740, French explorers from the east sometimes used the name Padouca for the Comanche; it was already used for the Plains Apache.

Government
The Comanche Nation is headquartered in Lawton, Oklahoma. Their tribal jurisdictional area is located in Caddo, Comanche, Cotton, Greer, Jackson, Kiowa, Tillman and Harmon counties. Their current Tribal Chairman is Mark Woommavovah. The tribe requires enrolled members to have at least 1/8 blood quantum level (equivalent to one great-grandparent).

Economic development
The tribe operates its own housing authority and issues tribal vehicle tags. They have their own Department of Higher Education, primarily awarding scholarships and financial aid for members' college educations. They own 10 tribal smoke shops and four casinos:
 Comanche Nation Casino in Lawton
 Red River Casino in Devol, Oklahoma 
 Comanche Spur Casino in Elgin, Oklahoma
 Comanche Star Casino in Walters, Oklahoma.

Cultural institutions

The Comanche National Museum and Cultural Center in Lawton, Oklahoma, has permanent and changing exhibitions on Comanche history and culture. It opened to the public in 2007.

In 2002, the tribe founded the Comanche Nation College, a two-year tribal college in Lawton. It closed in 2017 because of problems with accreditation and funding.

Each July, Comanche gather from across the United States to celebrate their heritage and culture in Walters at the annual Comanche Homecoming powwow. The Comanche Nation Fair takes place every September. The Comanche Little Ponies host two annual dances—one over New Year's Eve and one in May.

History

Formation

The Proto-Comanche movement to the Plains was part of the larger phenomenon known as the “Shoshonean Expansion” in which that language family spread across the Great Basin and across the mountains into Wyoming. The Kotsoteka (‘Bison Eaters’) were probably among the first. Other groups followed. Contact with the Shoshones of Wyoming was maintained until the 1830s when it was broken by the advancing Cheyennes and Arapahoes.

After the Pueblo Revolt of 1680, various Plains peoples acquired horses, but it was probably some time before they were very numerous.
As late as 1725, Comanches were described as using large dogs rather than horses to carry their bison hide "campaign tents".

The horse became a key element in the emergence of a distinctive Comanche culture. It was of such strategic importance that some scholars suggested that the Comanche broke away from the Shoshone and moved south to search for additional sources of horses among the settlers of New Spain to the south (rather than search for new herds of buffalo.) The Comanche have the longest documented existence as horse-mounted Plains peoples; they had horses when the Cheyennes still lived in earth lodges.

The Comanche supplied horses and mules to all comers. As early as 1795, Comanche were selling horses to Anglo-American traders  and by the mid-19th century, Comanche-supplied horses were flowing into St. Louis via other Indian middlemen (Seminole, Osage, Shawnee).

Their original migration took them to the southern Great Plains, into a sweep of territory extending from the Arkansas River to central Texas. The earliest references to them in the Spanish records date from 1706, when reports reached Santa Fe that Utes and Comanches were about to attack. In the Comanche advance, the Apaches were driven off the Plains. By the end of the 18th century the struggle between Comanches and Apaches had assumed legendary proportions: in 1784, in recounting the history of the southern Plains, Texas governor Domingo Cabello y Robles recorded that some 60 years earlier (i.e., ca. 1724) the Apaches had been routed from the southern Plains in a nine-day battle at La Gran Sierra del Fierro ‘The Great Mountain of Iron’, somewhere northwest of Texas. There is, however, no other record, documentary or legendary, of such a fight.

They were formidable warriors who developed strategies for using traditional weapons for fighting on horseback. Warfare was a major part of Comanche life. Comanche raids into Mexico traditionally took place during the full moon, when the Comanche could see to ride at night. This led to the term "Comanche Moon", during which the Comanche raided for horses, captives, and weapons. Comanche raids, especially in the 1840s, reached hundreds of miles deep into Mexico devastating northern parts of the country.

Divisions
Kavanagh has defined four levels of social-political integration in traditional pre-reservation Comanche society:
Patrilineal and patrilocal nuclear family
Extended family group (nʉmʉnahkahni – "the people who live together in a household", no size limits, but kinship recognition was limited to relatives two generations above or three below)
Residential local group or 'band', comprised one or more nʉmʉnahkahni, one of which formed its core. The band was the primary social unit of the Comanche. A typical band might number several hundred people. It was a family group, centered around a group of men, all of whom were relatives, sons, brothers or cousins. Since marriage with a known relative was forbidden, wives came from another group, and sisters left to join their husbands. The central man in that group was their grandfather, father, or uncle. He was called 'paraivo', 'chief'. After his death, one of the other men took his place; if none were available, the band members might drift apart to other groups where they might have relatives and/or establish new relations by marrying an existing member. There was no separate term for or status of 'peace chief' or 'war chief'; any man leading a war party was a 'war chief'.
Division (sometimes called tribe, Spanish nación, rama – "branch", comprising several local groups linked by kinship, sodalities (political, medicine, and military) and common interest in hunting, gathering, war, peace, trade).

In contrast to the neighboring Cheyenne and Arapaho to the north, there was never a single Comanche political unit or "Nation" recognized by all Comanches. Rather the divisions; the most "tribe-like" units, acted independently, pursuing their own economic and political goals.

Before the 1750s, the Spanish identified three Comanche Naciones (divisions): Hʉpenʉʉ (Jupe, Hoipi), Yaparʉhka (Yamparika), and Kʉhtsʉtʉhka (Kotsoteka).

After the Mescalero Apache, Jicarilla Apache and Lipan Apache had been largely displaced from the Southern Plains by the Comanche and allied tribes in the 1780s, the Spanish began to divide the now dominant Comanche into two geographical groups, which only partially corresponded to the former three Naciónes. The Kʉhtsʉtʉhka (Kotsoteka) ('Buffalo Eaters'), which had moved southeast in the 1750s and 1760s to the Southern Plains in Texas, were called Cuchanec Orientales ("Eastern Cuchanec/Kotsoteka") or Eastern Comanche, while those Kʉhtsʉtʉhka (Kotsoteka) that remained in the northwest and west, together with Hʉpenʉʉ (Jupe, Hoipi - 'Timber/Forest People') (and sometimes Yaparʉhka (Yamparika)), which had moved southward to the North Canadian River, were called Cuchanec Occidentales ("Western Cuchanec/Kotsoteka") or Western Comanche. The "Western Comanche" lived in the region of the upper Arkansas, Canadian, and Red Rivers, and the Llano Estacado. The "Eastern Comanche" lived on the Edwards Plateau and the Texas plains of the upper Brazos and Colorado Rivers, and east to the Cross Timbers.
They were probably the ancestors of the Penatʉka Nʉʉ (Penateka - 'Honey Eaters').

Over time, these divisions were altered in various ways, primarily due to changes in political resources. As noted above, the Kʉhtsʉtʉhka (Kotsoteka) were probably the first proto-Comanche group to separate from the Eastern Shoshones.

The name Hʉpenʉʉ (Jupe, Hoipi) vanished from history in the early 19th century, probably merging into the other divisions, they are likely the forerunners of the Nokoni Nʉʉ (Nokoni), Kwaarʉ Nʉʉ (Kwahadi, Quohada), and the Hʉpenʉʉ (Hois) local group of the Penatʉka Nʉʉ (Penateka). Due to pressure by southwards moving Kiowa and Plains Apache (Naishan) raiders, many Yaparʉhka (Yamparika) moved southeast, joining the "Eastern Comanche" and becoming known as the Tahnahwah (Tenawa, Tenahwit). Many Kiowa and Plains Apache moved to northern Comancheria and became later closely associated with the Yaparʉhka (Yamparika).

In the mid 19th century, other powerful divisions arose, such as the Nokoni Nʉʉ (Nokoni) ('wanderers', literally 'go someplace and return'), and the Kwaarʉ Nʉʉ (Kwahadi, Quohada) ('Antelope Eaters'). The latter originally some local groups of the Kʉhtsʉtʉhka (Kotsoteka) from the Cimarron River Valley as well as descendants of some Hʉpenʉʉ (Jupe, Hoipi), which had pulled both southwards.

The northernmost Comanche division was the Yaparʉhka (Yapai Nʉʉ or Yamparika — ‘(Yap)Root-Eaters’). As the last band to move onto the Plains, they retained much of their Eastern Shoshone tradition.

The power and success of the Comanche attracted bands of neighboring peoples who joined them and became part of Comanche society; an Arapaho group became known as Saria Tʉhka (Chariticas, Sata Teichas - 'Dog Eaters') band, an Eastern Shoshone group as Pohoi (Pohoee - 'wild sage') band, and a Plains Apache group as Tasipenanʉʉ band.

The Texans and Americans divided the Comanche into five large dominant bands - the Yaparʉhka (Yamparika), Kʉhtsʉtʉhka (Kotsoteka), Nokoni Nʉʉ (Nokoni), Penatʉka Nʉʉ (Penateka) and Kwaarʉ Nʉʉ (Kwahadi, Quohada), which in turn were divided by geographical terms into first three (later four) regional groupings: Northern Comanche, Middle Comanche, Southern Comanche, Eastern Comanche, and later Western Comanche. However, these terms generally do not correspond to the Native language terms.

The "Northern Comanche" label encompassed the Yaparʉhka (Yamparika) between the Arkansas River and Canadian River and the prominent and powerful Kʉhtsʉtʉhka (Kotsoteka) who roamed the high plains of Oklahoma and Texas Panhandles between Red and Canadian River, the famous Palo Duro Canyon offered them and their horse herds of protection from strong winter storms as well as from enemies, because the two bands dominated and ranged in the northern Comancheria.

The "Middle Comanche" label encompassed the aggressive Nokoni Nʉʉ (Nokoni) ("wanderers", "those who turn back") between the headwaters of the Red River and the Colorado River in the south and the Western Cross Timbers in the east, their preferred range were on the Brazos River headwaters and its tributaries, the Pease River offered protection from storms and enemies. With them shared two smaller bands the same tribal areas: the Tahnahwah (Tenawa, Tenahwit) ("Those Living Downstream") and Tanimʉʉ (Tanima, Dahaʉi, Tevawish) ("Liver Eaters"). All three bands together were known as "Middle Comanche" because they lived "in the middle" of the Comancheria.

The "Southern Comanche" label encompassed the Penatʉka Nʉʉ (Penateka) ("Honey Eaters"), the southernmost, largest, and best known band among whites as they lived near the first Spanish and Texan settlements; their tribal areas extended from the upper reaches of the rivers in central Texas and Colorado River southward, including much of the Edwards Plateau, and eastward to the Western Cross Timbers; because they dominated the southern Comancheria they were called "Southern Comanche".

The "Western Comanche" label encompassed the Kwaarʉ Nʉʉ (Kwahadi, Quohada) ('Antelope Eaters'), which is the last to develop as an independent band in the 19th century. They lived on the hot, low-shadow desert plateaus of Llano Estacado in eastern New Mexico and found shelter in Tule Canyon and Palo Duro Canyon in northwestern Texas. They were the only band that never signed a contract with the Texans or Americans, and they were the last to give up the resistance. Because of their relative isolation from the other bands on the westernmost edge of the Comancheria, they were called the "Western Comanche".

There has been, and continues to be, much confusion in the presentation of Comanche group names. Groups on all levels of organization, families, nʉmʉnahkahni, bands, and divisions, were given names, but many 'band lists' do not distinguish these levels. In addition, there could be alternate names and nicknames. The spelling differences between Spanish and English add to the confusion.

Some of the Comanche group names 
 Yaparʉhka or Yamparika (also Yapai Nʉʉ — ‘(Yap)Root-Eaters’; One of its local groups may have been called Widyʉ Nʉʉ / Widyʉ / Widyʉ Yapa — ‘Awl People’; after the death of a man named 'Awl' they changed their name to Tʉtsahkʉnanʉʉ or Ditsahkanah — ‘Sewing People’ [Titchahkaynah]. Other Yapai local groups included: 
 Ketahtoh or Ketatore (‘Don't Wear Shoes’, also called Napwat Tʉ — ‘Wearing No Shoes’)
 Motso (′Bearded Ones′, derived from motso — ‘Beard’)
 Pibianigwai (‘Loud Talkers’, ‘Loud Askers’)
 Sʉhmʉhtʉhka (‘Eat Everything’) 
 Wahkoh (‘Shell Ornament’)
 Waw'ai or Wohoi (also Waaih – ′Lots of Maggots on the Penis′, also called Nahmahe'enah – ′Somehow being (sexual) together′, ′to have sex′, called by other groups, because they preferred to marry endogamy and chose their partners from their own local group; this was viewed critically by other Comanche people)
 Hʉpenʉʉ or Jupe (‘Timber People’ because they lived in more wooded areas in the Central Plains north of the Arkansas River. Also spelled Hois.
 Kʉhtsʉtʉʉka or Kotsoteka (‘Buffalo-Eaters’, spelled in Spanish as Cuchanec)
 Kwaarʉnʉʉ or Kwahadi/Quohada (Kwahare — ‘Antelope-Eaters’; nicknamed Kwahihʉʉki — ‘Sunshades on Their Backs’, because they lived on desert plains of the Llano Estacado in eastern New Mexico, westernmost Comanche Band). One of their local groups was nicknamed  Parʉhʉya ('Elk', literally‘Water Horse’).
 Nokoninʉʉ or Nokoni (‘Movers’, ‘Returners’); allegedly, after the death of chief Peta Nocona they called themselves Noyʉhkanʉʉ — ‘Not Staying in one place’, and/orTʉtsʉ Noyʉkanʉʉ / Detsanayʉka — ‘Bad Campers’, ‘Poor Wanderer’.
 Tahnahwah or Tenawa (also Tenahwit — ‘Those Who Live Downstream’,
 Tanimʉʉ or Tanima (also called Dahaʉi or Tevawish — ‘Liver-Eaters’,
 Penatʉka Nʉʉ or Penateka (other variants: Pihnaatʉka, Penanʉʉ — ‘Honey-Eaters’;

Some names given by others include: 
 WahaToya (literally 'Two Mountains'); (given as Foothills in Cloud People - those who live near Walsenburg, CO)<Whatley: Jemez-Comanche-Kiowa repatriation, 1993-1999>
 Toyanʉmʉnʉ (′Foothills People′ - those who lived near Las Vegas, NM) <Whatley: Jemez-Comanche-Kiowa repatriation, 1993-1999>

Unassignable names include: 
 Tayʉʉwit / Teyʉwit (‘Hospitable Ones’)
 Kʉvahrahtpaht (‘Steep Climbers’)
 Taykahpwai / Tekapwai (‘No Meat’)
 Pagatsʉ (Pa'káh'tsa — ‘Head of the Stream’, also called Pahnaixte — ‘Those Who Live Upstream’)
 Mʉtsahne or Motsai (‘Undercut Bank’)

Old Shoshone names 
 Pekwi Tʉhka (‘Fish-Eaters’)
 Pohoi / Pohoee (‘Wild Sage’)

Other names, which may or may not refer to Comanche groups include:
 Hani Nʉmʉ (Hai'ne'na'ʉne — ‘Corn Eating People’) Wichitas.
 It'chit'a'bʉd'ah (Utsu'itʉ — ‘Cold People’, i.e. ‘Northern People’, probably another name for the Yaparʉhka or one of their local groups - because they lived to the north)
 Itehtah'o (‘Burnt Meat’, nicknamed by other Comanche, because they threw their surplus of meat out in the spring, where it dried and became black, looking like burnt meat)
 Naʉ'niem (No'na'ʉm — ‘Ridge People’

Modern Local Groups
 Ohnonʉʉ (also Ohnʉnʉnʉʉ or Onahʉnʉnʉʉ, 'Salt People' or 'Salt Creek people') live in Caddo County in the vicinity of Cyril, Oklahoma; mostly descendants of the Nokoni Pianavowit.
 Wianʉʉ (Wianʉ, Wia'ne — ‘Hill Wearing Away’), live east of Walters, Oklahoma, descendants of Waysee.

Comanche Wars

The Comanche fought a number of conflicts against Spanish and later Mexican and American armies. These were both expeditionary, as with the raids into Mexico, and defensive. The Comanche were noted as fierce warriors who fought vigorously for their homeland of Comancheria. However, the massive population of the settlers from the east and the diseases they brought led to pressure and decline of Comanche power and the cessation of their major presence in the southern Great Plains.

Relationship with settlers

The Comanche maintained an ambiguous relationship with Europeans and later settlers attempting to colonize their territory. The Comanche were valued as trading partners since 1786 via the Comancheros of New Mexico, but were feared for their raids against settlers in Texas. Similarly, they were, at one time or another, at war with virtually every other Native American group living on the South Plains, leaving opportunities for political maneuvering by European colonial powers and the United States. At one point, Sam Houston, president of the newly created Republic of Texas, almost succeeded in reaching a peace treaty with the Comanche in the 1844 Treaty of Tehuacana Creek. His efforts were thwarted in 1845 when the Texas legislature refused to create an official boundary between Texas and the Comancheria.

While the Comanche managed to maintain their independence and increase their territory, by the mid-19th century, they faced annihilation because of a wave of epidemics due to Eurasian diseases to which they had no immunity, such as smallpox and measles. Outbreaks of smallpox (1817, 1848) and cholera (1849) took a major toll on the Comanche, whose population dropped from an estimated 20,000 in the late 18th century to just a few thousand by the 1870s.

However, the government did not prevent the slaughtering of the herds. The Comanche under Quenatosavit White Eagle (later called Isa-tai "Coyote's Vagina") retaliated by attacking a group of hunters in the Texas Panhandle in the Second Battle of Adobe Walls (1874). The attack was a disaster for the Comanche, and the US army was called in during the Red River War to drive the remaining Comanche in the area into the reservation, culminating in the Battle of Palo Duro Canyon. Within just 10 years, the buffalo were on the verge of extinction, effectively ending the Comanche way of life as hunters. In May 1875, the last free band of Comanches, led by the Quahada warrior Quanah Parker, surrendered and moved to the Fort Sill reservation in Oklahoma. The last independent Kiowa and Kiowa Apache had also surrendered.

The 1890 Census showed 1,598 Comanche at the Fort Sill reservation, which they shared with 1,140 Kiowa and 326 Kiowa Apache.

Cherokee Commission
New allotments were made in 1906 to all children born after the agreement, and the remaining land was opened to white settlement. With this new arrangement, the era of the Comanche reservation came to an abrupt end.

Meusebach–Comanche treaty
The Peneteka band agreed to a peace treaty with the German Immigration Company under John O. Meusebach. This treaty was not affiliated with any level of government. Meusebach brokered the treaty to settle the lands on the Fisher-Miller Land Grant, from which were formed the 10 counties of Concho, Kimble, Llano, Mason, McCulloch, Menard, Schleicher, San Saba, Sutton, and Tom Green. In contrast to many treaties of its day, this treaty was very brief and simple, with all parties agreeing to a mutual cooperation and a sharing of the land. The treaty was agreed to at a meeting in San Saba County, and signed by all parties on May 9, 1847 in Fredericksburg, Texas. The treaty was very specifically between the Peneteka band and the German Immigration Company. No other band or tribe was involved. The German Immigration Company was dissolved by Meusebach himself shortly after it had served its purpose. By 1875, the Comanches had been relocated to reservations. Five years later, artist Friedrich Richard Petri and his family moved to the settlement of Pedernales, near Fredericksburg. Petri's sketches and watercolors gave witness to the friendly relationships between the Germans and various local Native American tribes.

Fort Martin Scott treaty
In 1850, another treaty was signed in San Saba, between the United States government and a number of local tribes, among which were the Comanches. This treaty was named for the nearest military fort, which was Fort Martin Scott. The treaty was never officially ratified by any level of government and was binding only on the part of the Native Americans.

Captive Herman Lehmann
One of the most famous captives in Texas was a German boy named Herman Lehmann. He had been kidnapped by the Apaches, only to escape and be rescued by the Comanches. Lehmann became the adoptive son of Quanah Parker. On August 26, 1901, Quanah Parker provided a legal affidavit verifying Lehmann's life as his adopted son 1877–1878. On May 29, 1908, the United States Congress authorized the United States Secretary of the Interior to allot Lehmann, as an adopted member of the Comanche nation, 160 acres of Oklahoma land, near Grandfield.

Recent history

Entering the Western economy was a challenge for the Comanche in the late 19th and early 20th centuries. Many tribal members were defrauded of whatever remained of their land and possessions. Appointed paramount chief by the United States government, Chief Quanah Parker campaigned vigorously for better deals for his people, meeting with Washington politicians frequently; and helped manage land for the tribe.

Parker became wealthy as a cattleman. He also campaigned for the Comanches' permission to practice the Native American Church religious rites, such as the usage of peyote, which was condemned by European Americans.

Before the first Oklahoma legislature, Quanah testified:
I do not think this legislature should interfere with a man's religion, also these people should be allowed to retain this health restorer. These healthy gentleman before you use peyote and those that do not use it are not so healthy.

During World War II, many Comanche left the traditional tribal lands in Oklahoma to seek jobs and more opportunities in the cities of California and the Southwest. About half of the Comanche population still lives in Oklahoma, centered on the town of Lawton.

Recently, an 80-minute 1920 silent film was "rediscovered", titled The Daughter of Dawn. It features a cast of more than 300 Comanche and Kiowa.

Culture

Childbirth

If a woman went into labor while the band was in camp, she was moved to a tipi, or a brush lodge if it was summer. One or more of the older women assisted as midwives. Men were not allowed inside the tipi during or immediately after the delivery.

First, the midwives softened the earthen floor of the tipi and dug two holes. One of the holes was for heating water and the other for the afterbirth. One or two stakes were driven into the ground near the expectant mother's bedding for her to grip during the pain of labor. After the birth, the midwives hung the umbilical cord on a hackberry tree. The people believed that if the umbilical cord was not disturbed before it rotted, the baby would live a long and prosperous life.

The newborn was swaddled and remained with its mother in the tipi for a few days. The baby was placed in a cradleboard, and the mother went back to work. She could easily carry the cradleboard on her back, or prop it against a tree where the baby could watch her while she collected seeds or roots. Cradleboards consisted of a flat board to which a basket was attached. The latter was made from rawhide straps, or a leather sheath that laced up the front. With soft, dry moss as a diaper, the young one was safely tucked into the leather pocket. During cold weather, the baby was wrapped in blankets, and then placed in the cradleboard. The baby remained in the cradleboard for about ten months; then it was allowed to crawl around.

Both girls and boys were welcomed into the band, but boys were favored. If the baby was a boy, one of the midwives informed the father or grandfather, "It's your close friend". Families might paint a flap on the tipi to tell the rest of the tribe that they had been strengthened with another warrior. Sometimes a man named his child, but mostly the father asked a medicine man (or another man of distinction) to do so. He did this in the hope of his child living a long and productive life. During the public naming ceremony, the medicine man lit his pipe and offered smoke to the heavens, earth, and each of the four directions. He prayed that the child would remain happy and healthy. He then lifted the child to symbolize its growing up and announced the child's name four times. He held the child a little higher each time he said the name. It was believed that the child's name foretold its future; even a weak or sick child could grow up to be a great warrior, hunter, and raider if given a name suggesting courage and strength. Boys were often named after their grandfather, uncle, or other relative. Girls were usually named after one of their father's relatives, but the name was selected by the mother. As children grew up they also acquired nicknames at different points in their lives, to express some aspect of their lives.

Children

The Comanche looked on their children as their most precious gift. Children were rarely punished. Sometimes, though, an older sister or other relative was called upon to discipline a child, or the parents arranged for a boogey man to scare the child. Occasionally, old people donned sheets and frightened disobedient boys and girls. Children were also told about Big Maneater Owl (Pia Mupitsi), who lived in a cave on the south side of the Wichita Mountains and ate bad children at night.

Children learned from example, by observing and listening to their parents and others in the band. As soon as she was old enough to walk, a girl followed her mother about the camp and played at the daily tasks of cooking and making clothing. She was also very close to her mother's sisters, who were called not aunt but pia, meaning mother. She was given a little deerskin doll, which she took with her everywhere. She learned to make all the clothing for the doll.

A boy identified not only with his father but with his father's family, as well as with the bravest warriors in the band. He learned to ride a horse before he could walk. By the time he was four or five, he was expected to be able to skillfully handle a horse. When he was five or six, he was given a small bow and arrows. Often, a boy was taught to ride and shoot by his grandfather, since his father and other warriors were on raids and hunts. His grandfather also taught him about his own boyhood and the history and legends of the Comanche.

As the boy grew older, he joined the other boys to hunt birds. He eventually ranged farther from camp looking for better game to kill. Encouraged to be skillful hunters, boys learned the signs of the prairie as they learned to patiently and quietly stalk game. They became more self-reliant, yet, by playing together as a group, also formed the bonds and cooperative spirit that they would need when they hunted and raided.

Boys were highly respected because they would become warriors and might die young in battle. As he approached manhood, a boy went on his first buffalo hunt. If he made a kill, his father honored him with a feast. Only after he had proven himself on a buffalo hunt was a young man allowed to go to war.

When he was ready to become a warrior, at about age 15 or 16, a young man first "made his medicine" by going on a vision quest (a rite of passage). Following this quest, his father gave him a good horse to ride into battle and another mount for the trail. If he had proved himself as a warrior, a Give Away Dance might be held in his honor. As drummers faced east, the honored boy and other young men danced. His parents, along with his other relatives and the people in the band, threw presents at his feet – especially blankets and horses symbolized by sticks. Anyone might snatch one of the gifts for themselves, although those with many possessions refrained; they did not want to appear greedy. People often gave away all their belongings during these dances, providing for others in the band, but leaving themselves with nothing.

Girls learned to gather berries, nuts, and roots. They carried water and collected wood, and at about 12 years old learned to cook meals, make tipis, sew clothing, prepare hides, and perform other tasks essential to becoming a wife and mother. They were then considered ready to be married.

Death
During the 19th century, the traditional Comanche burial custom was to wrap the deceased's body in a blanket and place it on a horse, behind a rider, who would then ride in search of an appropriate burial place, such as a secure cave. After entombment, the rider covered the body with stones and returned to camp, where the mourners burned all the deceased's possessions. The primary mourner slashed his arms to express his grief. The Quahada band followed this custom longer than other bands and buried their relatives in the Wichita Mountains. Christian missionaries persuaded Comanche people to bury their dead in coffins in graveyards, which is the practice today.

Transportation and habitation

When they lived with the Shoshone, the Comanche mainly used dog-drawn travois for transportation. Later, they acquired horses from other tribes, such as the Pueblo, and from the Spaniards. Because horses are faster, easier to control and stronger, this helped with hunting, warfare and moving camp. Larger dwellings were made due to the ability to pull and carry more belongings. Being herbivores, horses were also easier to feed than dogs, since meat was a valuable resource. The horse was of the utmost value to the Comanche. A Comanche man's wealth was measured by the size of his horse herd. Horses were prime targets to steal during raids; often raids were conducted specifically to capture horses. Often horse herds numbering in the hundreds were stolen by Comanche during raids against other Indian nations, Spanish, Mexicans, and later from the ranches of Texans. Horses were used for warfare with the Comanche being considered to be among the finest light cavalry and mounted warriors in history.

The Comanche covered their tipis with buffalo hides sewn together. To prepare the hides, women spread them on the ground, scraped off the fat and flesh with blades of bone or antler, and dried them in the sun. Then the women scraped off the thick hair and soaked the hides in water. After several days, they vigorously rubbed them in a mixture of fat, brains and liver to soften them. They softened them further by rinsing and working back and forth over a rawhide thong. Finally, they were smoked over a fire, which gave them a tan color. To finish the tipi covering, women laid the tanned hides side by side and stitched them together. As many as 22 hides could be used, but 14 was the average. The sewn cover was tied to a pole and raised, wrapped around the cone-shaped frame, and pinned with pencil-sized wooden skewers. Two wing-shaped flaps at the top of the tipi were turned back to make an opening, which could be adjusted to keep out moisture and held pockets of insulating air. With a fire pit in the center of the earthen floor, the tipis stayed warm in winter. In summer, the bottom edges of the tipis could be rolled up to let in a breeze. Cooking was done outside during hot weather. Tipis were very practical homes for nomads. Working together, women could quickly set them up or take them down. An entire Comanche band could be packed and chasing a buffalo herd within about 20 minutes. The women did most food processing and preparation.

Food

The Comanche were initially hunter-gatherers. When they lived in the Rocky Mountains, during their migration to the Great Plains, both men and women shared responsibility for gathering and providing food. When the Comanche reached the plains, hunting predominated. Hunting was considered a male activity and was a principal source of prestige. For meat, the Comanche hunted buffalo, elk, black bear, pronghorn, and deer. When game was scarce, the men hunted wild mustangs, and sometimes ate their own ponies. In later years the Comanche raided Texas ranches and stole longhorn cattle. They did not eat fish or fowl, unless starving. 

Women prepared and cooked bison meat and other game. Women also gathered wild fruits, seeds, nuts, berries, roots and tubers, including plums, grapes, juniper berries, persimmons, mulberries, acorns, pecans, wild onions, radishes, and tuna, the fruit of the prickly pear cactus. The Comanche also acquired maize, dried pumpkin, and tobacco through trade and raids. They roasted meat over a fire or boiled it. To boil fresh or dried meat and vegetables, women dug a pit in the ground, which they lined with animal skins or buffalo stomach and filled with water to make a kind of cooking pot. They placed heated stones in the water until it boiled and had cooked their stew. After Spanish contact, Comanche traded for copper pots and iron kettles, which made cooking easier.

Women used berries and nuts, as well as honey and tallow, to flavor buffalo meat. They stored the tallow in intestine casings or rawhide pouches called oyóotû¿. They especially liked to make a sweet mush of buffalo marrow mixed with crushed mesquite beans.

The Comanches sometimes ate raw meat, especially raw liver flavored with gall. They also drank the milk from the slashed udders of buffalo, deer, and elk. Among their delicacies was the curdled milk from the stomachs of suckling buffalo calves. They also enjoyed buffalo tripe, or stomachs.

Comanche generally ate a light meal breakfast and a large dinner. They ate during the day when they were hungry or when it was convenient. Like other Plains Indians, the Comanche were very hospitable. They prepared meals whenever a visitor arrived in camp, which led to outsiders' belief that the Comanches ate at all hours of the day or night. Many families offered thanks as they sat down to eat their meals.

Comanche children ate pemmican, but this was primarily a tasty, high-energy food reserved for war parties. Carried in a parfleche pouch, pemmican was eaten only when the men did not have time to hunt. Similarly, in camp, people ate pemmican only when other food was scarce. Traders ate pemmican sliced and dipped in honey, which they called Indian bread.

Clothing

Comanche clothing was simple and easy to wear. Men wore a leather belt with a breechcloth — a long piece of buckskin brought up between the legs and looped over and under the belt at the front and back, and loose-fitting deerskin leggings. Moccasins had soles made from thick, tough buffalo hide with soft deerskin uppers. Men wore nothing on the upper body, except in winter when they wore heavy robes of buffalo hide (or occasionally, bear, wolf, or coyote skins) with knee-length buffalo-hide boots. Young boys usually went naked except in cold weather. By age 8 or 9, they wore adult clothing. In the 19th century, men had replaced the buckskin breechcloths by woven cloth, and wore loose-fitting buckskin shirts. Women wore long deerskin dresses with a flared skirt and wide, long sleeves, with buckskin fringes on the sleeves and hem. Beads and pieces of metal were attached in geometric patterns. Women wore buckskin moccasins with buffalo soles. Women decorated their shirts, leggings and moccasins with fringes of deer-skin, animal fur, and human hair. They also decorated their shirts and leggings with patterns and shapes of beads and scraps of material. In winter they, too, wore warm buffalo robes and tall, fur-lined buffalo-hide boots. Unlike boys, girls old enough to walk were dressed in breechcloths. By age 12 or 13, they wore women's clothing.

Hair and headgear
Comanche people took pride in their hair, which was worn long. They arranged it with porcupine quill brushes, greased it and parted it in the center from the forehead to the back of the neck. They painted the scalp along the parting with yellow, red, or white clay (or other colors). They wore their hair in two long braids tied with leather thongs or colored cloth, and sometimes wrapped with beaver fur. They also braided a strand of hair from the top of their head. This slender braid, called a scalp lock, was decorated with colored scraps of cloth and beads, and a single feather. Comanche men rarely wore anything on their heads. Only after they moved onto a reservation late in the 19th century did men begin to wear the typical Plains headdress. In severe cold, they might wear a brimless, woolly buffalo hide hat. At war, some warriors wore a headdress of buffalo scalp. Warriors cut away most of the hide and flesh from a buffalo head, leaving only a portion of the woolly head and the horns. This type of hat was worn only by the Comanche. Women did not let their hair grow as long as the men did. Young women might wear their hair long and braided, but women parted their hair in the middle and kept it short. Like the men, they painted their scalp along the parting with bright paint.

Body decoration
Comanche men usually had pierced ears with hanging earrings made of pieces of shell or loops of brass or silver wire. A female relative would pierce the outer edge of the ear with six or eight holes. The men also tattooed his face, arms, and chest with geometric designs, and painted his face and body. Traditionally they used paints made of berry juice and the colored clays of the Comancheria. Later, traders supplied them with vermilion (red pigment) and bright grease paints. Men wore bands of leather and strips of metal on their arms. Except for black, which was the color for war, there was no standard color or pattern for face and body painting: it was a matter of individual preference. For example, one man might paint one side of his face white and the other side red; another might paint one side of his body green and the other side with green and black stripes. One Comanche might always paint himself in a particular way, while another might change the colors and designs when so inclined. Some designs had special meaning to the individual, and special colors and designs might have been revealed in a dream. Women might also tattoo their face or arms. They were fond of painting their bodies and were free to do so as they pleased. It was popular for women to paint the insides of their ears a bright red and paint great orange and red circles on their cheeks. They usually painted red and yellow around their lips.

Art and material culture 
Because of their frequent traveling, Comanche had to make sure that their household goods and other possessions were unbreakable. They did not use pottery that could easily be broken on long journeys. Weaving, wood carving, and metal working were unknown. Instead, they depended on buffalo for most of their tools, household goods, and weapons. They made nearly 200 different utilitarian items from the horns, hide, and bones.

Removing the lining of the inner stomach, women made the paunch into a water bag. The lining was stretched over four sticks and filled with water to make a pot for cooking soups and stews. With wood scarce on the plains, women relied on buffalo chips (dried dung) as fuel for cooking and heat.

Stiff rawhide was fashioned into saddles, stirrups and cinches, knife cases, buckets, and moccasin soles. Rawhide was also made into rattles and drums. Strips of rawhide were twisted into sturdy ropes. Scraped to resemble white parchment, rawhide skins were folded to make parfleches in which food, clothing, and other personal belongings were kept. Women also tanned hides to make soft and supple buckskin, which was used for tipi covers, warm robes, blankets, cloths, and moccasins. They used buckskin for bedding, cradles, dolls, bags, pouches, quivers, and gun cases.

Sinew was used for bowstrings and sewing thread. Hooves were turned into glue and rattles. Horns were shaped into cups, spoons, and ladles, while the tail made a whip, fly-swatter, or a tipi decoration. Men made tools, scrapers, needles, pipes and children's toys from the bones. But men concentrated on making bows and arrows, lances, and shields. The thick neck skin of an old bull was ideal for war shields that deflected arrows as well as bullets. Since they spent most of each day on horseback, they also fashioned leather into saddles, stirrups, and other equipment for their mounts. Buffalo hair was used to fill saddle pads and was used in rope and halters.

Language

The language spoken by the Comanche people, Comanche (Numu tekwapu), is a Numic language of the Uto-Aztecan language group. It is closely related to the language of the Shoshone, from which the Comanche diverged around 1700. The two languages remain closely related, but a few low-level sound changes inhibit mutual intelligibility. The earliest records of Comanche from 1786 clearly show a dialect of Shoshone, but by the beginning of the 20th century, these sound changes had modified the way Comanche sounded in subtle, but profound, ways. Although efforts are now being made to ensure survival of the language, most of its speakers are elderly, and less than 1% of the Comanches can speak it.

In the late 19th century, many Comanche children were placed in boarding schools with children from different tribes. The children were taught English and discouraged from speaking their native language. Anecdotally, enforcement of speaking English was severe.

Quanah Parker learned and spoke English and was adamant that his own children do the same. The second generation then grew up speaking English, because it was believed that it was better for them not to know Comanche.

Comanches were among the Native Americans who were first utilized as Code Talkers by the U.S. Army during World War I.

During World War II, a group of 17 young men, referred to as "The Comanche Code Talkers", were trained and used by the U.S. Army to send messages conveying sensitive information that could not be deciphered by the Germans.

Notable Comanches

Historic Comanche people
These are notable Comanche people from the 18th and 19th centuries, prior to allotment. 

Amorous Man (Pahayoko) (late 1780s–c. 1860), Penateka chief 
 Black Horse (died ca. 1900), second chief of the Quahadi band
Buffalo Hump (Potsʉnakwahipʉ) (c. 1800-c. 1865/1870), war chief and later head chief of the Penateka division 
 Carne Muerto, Tehcap (1832—1860s), Quahadi war chief
 Tavibo Naritgant, Cuerno Verde (died 1779), war chief
 Horseback (Tʉhʉyakwahipʉ) (c. 1805/1810-c. 1888), chief of the Nokoni band
 Iron Jacket (Puhihwikwasu'u) (c. 1790-1858), war chief and later head chief of the Quahadi band; father of Peta Nocona
 Isatai (c. 1840–c. 1890), warrior and medicine man of the Quahadi
 Mow-way (Shaking Hand, Pushing-in-the-Middle) (c. 1825-1886), Kotsoteka chief 
 Old Owl (Mupitsukupʉ) (late 1780s–1849), Penateka chief 
 Peta Nocona (Lone Wanderer) (c. 1820 – c. 1864), chief of the Quahadi division; father of Quanah Parker
 Quanah Parker (c. 1845–1911), Quahadi chief, a founder of Native American Church and rancher
 White Parker (1887–1956), son of Quanah Parker and Methodist missionary
 Piaru-ekaruhkapu (Big Red Meat) (ca. 1820/1825-1875), Nokoni chief 
 Sanapia (1895–1984), medicine woman
 Santa Anna (c. 1800-c. 1849), war chief of the Penateka Band 
 Spirit Talker (Mukwooru) (c. 1780-1840), Penateka chief and medicine man
 Ten Bears (Pawʉʉrasʉmʉnunʉ) (c. 1790–1872), chief of the Ketahto band and later of the entire Yamparika division
 Tosawi (White Knife) (c. 1805/1810-c. 1878/1880), chief of the Penateka band
 Yellow Wolf (Isa-viah) (c. 1800/1805 - 1854), war chief of the Penateka division

Comanche Nation citizens 

These are 20th- and 21st-century citizens of the Comanche Nation.
 Charon Asetoyer (born 1951), activist and women's health advocate
 Blackbear Bosin (1921–1980), Comanche/Kiowa sculptor and painter
 Charles Chibitty (1921–2005), World War II Comanche code talker
 Karita Coffey, Tsat-Tah Mo-oh Kahn (born 1947), ceramic artist, professor, sculptor
 Marie C. Cox (1920-2005), founder of the North American Indian Women's Association and foster care reform advocate
 Jesse Ed Davis (1944-1988), guitarist and recording artist
 LaDonna Harris (born 1931), political activist and founder of Americans for Indian Opportunity
 Dorothy Sunrise Lorentino (1909–2005), educator, activist, sister of Morris Tabbyyetchy.
 Doc Tate Nevaquaya (1932–1996), Flatstyle painter, Native American flautist, NEA fellow
 Sonny Nevaquaya (d. 2019), Native American flute-player
 Diane O'Leary (1939–2013), artist, nurse
 Lotsee Patterson (born 1931), librarian, educator, and founder of the American Indian Library Association
 Paul Chaat Smith, Comanche/Choctaw author, curator
Morris Tabbyyetchy, WWII Comanche Code Talker.
 George Tahdooahnippah (born 1978), professional boxer and NABC super middleweight champion 
 Emma Tenayuca (1916-1999), 1930s labor leader
 Josephine Wapp (1912–2014), professor, regalia maker, textile artist
 David Yeagley (1951–2014), classical composer, political writer

See also

Quanah Parker Star House

References

Sources

 Nye, Wilbur Sturtevant. Carbine and Lance: The Story of Old Fort Sill, University of Oklahoma Press, Norman, 1983
 Leckie, William H.. The Buffalo Soldiers: A Narrative of the Negro Cavalry in the West, University of Oklahoma Press, Norman, 1967
 Fowler, Arlen L.. The Black Infantry in the West, 1869-1891, University of Oklahoma Press, Norman, 1996

Further reading
  Republished as

External links

Comanche Nation – official website
The Comanche Language and Cultural Preservation Committee
Comanche Lodge

 
Plains tribes
Native American tribes in Texas
Native American tribes in Oklahoma
Federally recognized tribes in the United States
Native American history of Texas
Texas–Indian Wars
Native American tribes in Colorado
Native American tribes in New Mexico